Internment is the imprisonment of people, commonly in large groups, without charges or intent to file charges. The term is especially used for the confinement "of enemy citizens in wartime or of terrorism suspects". Thus, while it can simply mean imprisonment, it tends to refer to preventive confinement rather than confinement after having been convicted of some crime. Use of these terms is subject to debate and political sensitivities. The word internment is also occasionally used to describe a neutral country's practice of detaining belligerent armed forces and equipment on its territory during times of war, under the Hague Convention of 1907.

Interned persons may be held in prisons or in facilities known as internment camps (also known as concentration camps). The term concentration camp originates from the Spanish–Cuban Ten Years' War when Spanish forces detained Cuban civilians in camps in order to more easily combat guerrilla forces. Over the following decades the British during the Second Boer War and the Americans during the Philippine–American War also used concentration camps.

The term "concentration camp" or "internment camp" is used to refer to a variety of systems that greatly differ in their severity, mortality rate, and architecture; their defining characteristic is that inmates are held outside the rule of law.  Extermination camps or death camps, whose primary purpose is killing, are also imprecisely referred to as "concentration camps".

The Universal Declaration of Human Rights restricts the use of internment, with Article 9 stating, "No one shall be subjected to arbitrary arrest, detention or exile."

Defining internment and concentration camp 

The American Heritage Dictionary defines the term concentration camp as: "A camp where persons are confined, usually without hearings and typically under harsh conditions, often as a result of their membership in a group which the government has identified as dangerous or undesirable."

Although the first example of civilian internment may date as far back as the 1830s, the English term concentration camp was first used in order to refer to the reconcentration camps (Spanish:reconcentrados)  which were set up by the Spanish military in Cuba during the Ten Years' War (1868–1878). The label was applied yet again to camps set up by the United States during the Philippine–American War (1899–1902). And expanded usage of the concentration camp label continued, when the British set up camps during the Second Boer War (1899–1902) in South Africa for interning Boers during the same time period.

During the 20th century, the arbitrary internment of civilians by the state reached its most extreme forms in the Soviet Gulag system of concentration camps (1918–1991) and the Nazi concentration camps (1933–1945). The Soviet system was the first applied by a government on its own citizens. The Gulag consisted in over 30,000 camps for most of its existence (1918–1991) and detained some 18 million from 1929 until 1953, which is only a third of its 73-year lifespan. The Nazi concentration camp system was extensive, with as many as 15,000 camps and at least 715,000 simultaneous internees. The total number of casualties in these camps is difficult to determine, but the deliberate policy of extermination through labor in many of the camps was designed to ensure that the inmates would die of starvation, untreated disease and summary executions within set periods of time. Moreover, Nazi Germany established six extermination camps, specifically designed to kill millions of people, primarily by gassing.

As a result, the term "concentration camp" is sometimes conflated with the concept of an "extermination camp" and historians debate whether the term "concentration camp" or the term "internment camp" should be used to describe other examples of civilian internment.

The former label continues to see expanded use for cases post-World War II, for instance in relation to British camps in Kenya during the Mau Mau rebellion (1952–1960), and camps set up in Chile during the military dictatorship of Augusto Pinochet (1973–1990). According to the United States Department of Defense as many as 3 million Uyghurs and members of other Muslim minority groups are being held in China's re-education camps which are located in the Xinjiang region and which American news reports often label as concentration camps. The camps were established in late 2010s under General Secretary Xi Jinping's administration.

Impact
Scholars have debated the efficacy of internment as a counterinsurgency tactic. A 2023 study found that internment during the Irish war of independence led to greater grievances among Irish rebels and led them to fight longer in the war.

Examples

Active
North Korean prison camps (1948–present)
Guantanamo Bay detention camp (2002–present)
Refugee detention centres in Libya (2011–present)
Uyghur re-education camps in China (2017–present)
Anti-gay detention camps in Chechnya (2017–present)
Trump administration migrant detentions as part of immigration detention in the United States (2018–present)

Closed
American Civil War prison camps (1861–1865)
Second Boer War in South Africa (1900–1902)
Herero and Namaqua genocide (1904–1907)
Concentration of Armenians during the Armenian Genocide (1915–1916)
Frongoch internment camp British camp used for WWI and Irish 1916 Easter Rising prisoners 
Finnish Civil War (1918)
Abercorn Barracks in Northen Ireland, also referred to as Ballykinlar Barracks (1919-1921)
Gormanston Camp in the Irish Free State (1922-1923)
Italian concentration camps in Africa and Europe (1930–1944)
German concentration camps before and during World War II (1933–1945)
Japanese internment of prisoners of war and civilians during World War II (ended 1945)
Curragh Camp in Ireland (1939-46 & 1957-59)
Japanese-American internment camps in World War II (1942–1946)
Japanese Canadian internment (1942–1949)
Cyprus internment camps (1946–1949)
Malayan New villages as part of the Briggs Plan during the Malayan Emergency (1950–1960)
Deoli interment camp in India (1962-1967)
HM Prison Maze in Northern Ireland (1971-75)
Omarska camp in Bosnia, 1992
Dretelj camp (1992–1995)
Camp Bucca in Iraq (2003–2009)
Abu Ghraib prison in Iraq (1980–2014)

See also

Civilian internee
Extermination through labor
Extrajudicial detention
Gulag
New village
Bantustan
House arrest
Labor camp
Kwalliso (North Korean political penal labour colonies)
Laogai (Chinese, "reform through labor")
Military Units to Aid Production
"Polish death camp" controversy
Prison overcrowding
Prisoner-of-war camp
Prisons in North Korea
Quasi-criminal

Re-education camp (Vietnam)
Re-education through labor
Remand (detention)

References

Further reading
 

 Exhaustive history of the internment camps. Also available in German

External links

 
Total institutions